Peter Wallén (born 26 February 1965) is a retired Swedish ice hockey player. Wallén was part of the Djurgården Swedish champions' team of 1989. Wallén made 25 Elitserien appearances for Djurgården.

References

Swedish ice hockey players
Djurgårdens IF Hockey players
1965 births
Living people
People from Värmdö Municipality
Sportspeople from Stockholm County